Sandra Rojas (born October 20, 1973) is a Mexican sprint canoer who competed in the mid-1990s. At the 1996 Summer Olympics in Atlanta, she was eliminated in the semifinals of both the K-2 500 m and the K-4 500 m events.

References
Sports-Reference.com profile

1973 births
Canoeists at the 1996 Summer Olympics
Living people
Mexican female canoeists
Olympic canoeists of Mexico
Pan American Games medalists in canoeing
Pan American Games bronze medalists for Mexico
Canoeists at the 1995 Pan American Games
Medalists at the 1995 Pan American Games
20th-century Mexican women
21st-century Mexican women